The Little Match Girl (Danish: Den lille pige med svovlstikkerne) is a 1953 Danish short adventure film directed by Johan Jacobsen. It is based on Hans Christian Andersen's story The Little Match Girl.

Cast
 Liselotte Krefeld as the little girl
 Agnes Thorberg Wieth as grandmother

References

Bibliography 
 Goble, Alan. The Complete Index to Literary Sources in Film. Walter de Gruyter, 1999.

External links 
 

1953 films
1950s Danish-language films
Danish short films
Films based on The Little Match Girl
Films directed by Johan Jacobsen
Danish adventure films
Danish black-and-white films
1953 adventure films